Douglas Ernest Fewster Brown (30 August 1923 – 18 June 2012) was an Australian rules footballer who played with Fitzroy and Geelong in the Victorian Football League (VFL).

Brown, who kicked three goals on his league debut, was a rover from Geelong District. He couldn't play with Geelong in 1943 as they weren't competing due to the war, so he instead spent the season with Fitzroy. In 1944 Geelong returned to the league and he appeared in eight of the opening nine rounds of the season with them. He missed the rest of the year and all of the 1945 season as he was serving as a Leading Aircraftman in the Royal Australian Air Force.

He proved a useful forward when resting in the forward pockets and contributed a career best 26 goals in 1947, from 15 games. His final appearance for Geelong was in their 17-point preliminary final loss to North Melbourne in 1950.

Having received a good offer from Tatura, Brown joined the Goulburn Valley Football League club as captain-coach in 1951. Brown was the league's leading goal-kicker that year with 86 goals. He would then lead Tatura to back to back premierships in 1952 and 1953.

References

1923 births
Fitzroy Football Club players
Geelong Football Club players
Tatura Football Club players
Royal Australian Air Force personnel of World War II
Australian rules footballers from Geelong
2012 deaths